The 1998 Meistriliiga was the eighth season of the Meistriliiga, Estonia's premier football league. The season was unusually short, played in the second half of 1998 to switch back to Nordic spring-to-autumn season format in the next year. Flora won their fourth title.

League table

Relegation play-off

Eesti Põlevkivi Jõhvi won 5-2 on aggregate and retained their Meistriliiga spot for the 1999 season.

Results

Top scorers

Notes

References
Estonia - List of final tables (RSSSF)

Meistriliiga seasons
1
Estonia